Rachel Lindsay may refer to:

 a pseudonym of Roberta Leigh, British author, artist, composer and television producer
 Rachel Lindsay (television personality), best known for her role as a contestant on The Bachelor and as the lead on The Bachelorette